The 2013 Bill Beaumont Cup, also known as Bill Beaumont Cup Division One, was the 113th version of the annual, English rugby union, County Championship organized by the RFU for the top tier English counties.  Each county drew its players from rugby union clubs from the third tier and below of the English rugby union league system (typically National League 1, National League 2 South or National League 2 North).  The counties were divided into two regional pools with the winners of each pool meeting in the final held at Twickenham Stadium.  New counties to the competition included Durham County (north) and Kent (south) who won their respective groups in the 2012 County Championship Plate.  Hertfordshire were the defending champions.  

The northern group was won by last year's runners up, Lancashire, who booked a place in their fifth successive final in what was a very close group, edging Cheshire and Yorkshire by virtue of a superior bonus points record.  They were joined by southern group winners, Cornwall, who were appearing in their first Twickenham final since 1999.  Cornwall had perhaps an easier route through to the final, winning all three games, but looked very impressive in their six try demolition of last year's winners, Hertfordshire, in their final pool game to book their place.  Both promoted counties, Durham County and Kent, were relegated to the 2014 County Championship Plate.

Over 10,000 Cornish fans made the journey to Twickenham but were unable to help their team to victory as Lancashire emerged victorious by defeating Cornwall, 35 - 26, in what was an exciting game.  Lancashire's Nick Royle had an excellent tournament by finishing top try scorer with 5 including 1 in the final, while Cornwall's Paul Thirlby was the tournament's top scorer with 47 points.

Competition format
The competition format was two regional group stages divided into north and south, with each team playing each other once.  This meant that two teams in the pool had two home games, while the other two had just one.  The top side in each group went through to the final held at Twickenham Stadium on 26 May 2013.

Participating Counties and ground locations

Group stage

Division 1 North

Round 1

Round 2

Round 3

Division 1 South

Round 1

Round 2

Round 3

Final

Total season attendances
Does not include final at Twickenham which is a neutral venue and involves teams from all three county divisions on the same day

Individual statistics
 Note if players are tied on tries or points the player with the lowest number of appearances will come first.  Also note that points scorers includes tries as well as conversions, penalties and drop goals.  Appearance figures also include coming on as substitutes (unused substitutes not included).  Statistics will also include final.

Top points scorers

Top try scorers

See also
 English rugby union system
 Rugby union in England

References

External links
 NCA Rugby

2012